O.B. Grant House is a historic home located at Ridgway in Elk County, Pennsylvania.  It was built in 1870 in the Italianate style.  It is a two-story, balloon-frame dwelling resting on a stone foundation and capped by an intersecting gable roof.

It was added to the National Register of Historic Places in 2004.

References

Houses on the National Register of Historic Places in Pennsylvania
Italianate architecture in Pennsylvania
Houses completed in 1870
Houses in Elk County, Pennsylvania
National Register of Historic Places in Elk County, Pennsylvania